Thliptoceras stygiale is a moth in the family Crambidae. It was described by George Hampson in 1896. It is found in India's Naga Hills.

References

Moths described in 1896
Pyraustinae